The UK Albums Chart is one of many music charts compiled by the Official Charts Company that calculates the best-selling albums of the week in the United Kingdom. Since 2004 the chart has been based on the sales of both physical albums and digital downloads. Since 2015, the album chart has been based on both sales and streaming. This list shows albums that peaked in the top ten of the UK Albums Chart during 2023, as well as albums which peaked in 2022 but were in the top 10 in 2023. The entry date is when the album appeared in the top 10 for the first time (week ending, as published by the Official Charts Company, which is six days after the chart is announced).

Forty albums have been in the top 10 so far this year (as of 23 March 2023, week ending). Two albums from 2021 and five albums from 2022 remained in the top ten for several weeks at the beginning of the year. Christmas by Michael Bublé, originally released in 2011, is the only album from 2022 so far to reach its peak until 2023.

The first new number-one album of the year was Christmas by Michael Bublé. Overall, nine different albums have peaked at number-one so far in 2023, with nine unique artists hitting that position.

An asterisk (*) in the "Weeks in Top 10" column shows that the album is currently in the top 10.

Top-ten albums
Key

Entries by artist
The following table shows artists who have achieved two or more top 10 entries in 2023, including albums that reached their peak in 2022. The figures only include main artists, with featured artists and appearances on compilation albums not counted individually for each artist. The total number of weeks an artist spent in the top ten in 2023 is also shown.

See also
List of UK Albums Chart number ones of the 2020s

References

Sources

External links
2023 album chart archive at the Official Charts Company (click on relevant week)

United Kingdom top 10 albums
Top 10 albums
2023